The 2021 mid-year rugby union internationals (also known as the summer internationals in the Northern Hemisphere) were a series of international rugby union matches that are typically played in the Southern Hemisphere during the July international window. Due to ongoing restrictions around the world due to the COVID-19 pandemic, a number of matches were cancelled, and some series reversed so that the Northern Hemisphere nations hosted the matches, and some teams played for the first time since their final matches of the 2019 Rugby World Cup.

The window was highlighted by the 2021 British & Irish Lions tour to South Africa, which included a three-test series between the Lions and South Africa. Ahead of the tour, the Lions hosted their first home match since 2005, against Japan in Scotland, while South Africa were scheduled to host a two-test series against Georgia; the first time the teams had met outside the Rugby World Cup. The second test of this series was cancelled. Japan went on to play Ireland. Ireland also played the United States, having had to adapt their summer tour after their test series away to Fiji was cancelled. To replace Ireland's tour, Fiji traveled to New Zealand for a first ever test series against the All Blacks, who also hosted Tonga. Tonga began their preparation for their 2023 Rugby World Cup qualification series against Samoa, and Samoa used a two-match series against the Māori All Blacks as their preparation. The three-test series between Australia and France was condensed to take place within 11 days, due to French club commitments and a hotel quarantine period for the France team. Australia go on to play New Zealand in the first Bledisloe Cup match of the year.

England and Wales's summer tours were reversed, as England welcomed Canada and the United States, and Wales hosted Argentina. Wales, who were originally meant to play Uruguay as part of their South America tour, instead played Canada ahead of their two-test series against Argentina. Argentina also prepared for the series with a first visit to Bucharest since 1992 to play Romania, which replaced Argentina's cancelled home game against Georgia. Romania were scheduled to face Scotland for the first time since 2011 and Scotland were also due to play Georgia as part of their Eastern Europe tour, but both matches were cancelled.

The window also contained a number of other 2023 Rugby World Cup qualification warm-ups as Uruguay played an Argentina XV, the Cook Islands played a Tasman Mako HP XV and the New Zealand U20 team, and Zimbabwe played Zambia. Zimbabwe were also scheduled to play Portugal, but the match was cancelled.

Series

Other tours

Fixtures

June

Notes:
 The sides faced each other for the first time since 2008.

Notes:
 Hamish Watson and Zander Fagerson (British & Irish Lions) were named to start, but was withdrawn in the week leading up to the game due to injury and head knock. Justin Tipuric replaced Watson whilst Tadhg Furlong was promoted from the bench to replace Fagerson - Kyle Sinckler replaced Furlong on the bench.
 No replacement was made for Jack Conan.
 Jack Cornelsen, Siosaia Fifita, Craig Millar and Naoto Saito (all Japan) made their international debuts.

 Japan became the eighth test nation to play the British & Irish Lions.

2/3/4 July

Notes:
 Giorgi Tsutskiridze (Georgia) was named to start but was injured in training ahead of the game and was replaced by Ilia Spanderashvili. Irakli Tskhadadze replaced Spanderashvili on the bench.
 Aphelele Fassi, Rosko Specman and Jasper Wiese (all South Africa) and Luka Japaridze (Georgia) made their international debuts.

Notes:
 Albert Anae and Ahsee Tuala (Samoa) were named to start but withdrew ahead of kick off due to injury and were replaced by Tomasi Alosio and Tietie Tuimauga. Jonah Aoina replaced Tuimauga on the bench.
 This was the Māori All Blacks' 125th international match.

Notes:
 Tau Kolomatangi (Tonga) was named as a replacement, but was replaced by Lua Li in the week leading up to the match after eligibility concerns over Kolomatangi arose surrounding a previous appearance for Hong Kong in 2019 possibly capturing the player to Hong Kong.
 Ethan Blackadder, George Bower, Finlay Christie and Quinn Tupaea (all New Zealand) and Walter Fifita, Nikolai Foliaki, Solomone Funaki, Fine Inisi, Mateaki Kafatolu, Lua Li, Don Lolo, Harrison Mataele, Sam Moli, Hosea Saumaki, Viliami Taulani, Sione Tuipulotu (all Tonga) made their international debuts.
 New Zealand equalled their highest winning margin over Tonga of 102 points, set in June 2000.
 New Zealand scored more than 100 points in a game for the sixth time.

Notes:
 Kazuki Himeno (Japan) was named to start but withdrew ahead of game day and was replaced by Tevita Tatafu. Amanaki Mafi replaced Tatafu on the bench.
 Gavin Coombes (Ireland) and Shane Gates and Semisi Masirewa (both Japan) made their international debuts.

Notes:
 Leigh Halfpenny (Wales) earned his 100th international cap (96 for Wales, 4 for the British & Irish Lions).
 Taine Basham, Ben Carter, Tom Rogers, Ben Thomas and Gareth Thomas (all Wales) and Ross Braude, Don Carson, Cooper Coats, Quinn Ngawati, Tyler Rowland, Michael Smith, Siaki Vikilani (all Canada) made their international debuts.

Notes:
 Emiliano Boffelli (Argentina) had been named to start but withdrew in the week leading up to the game; Santiago Cordero moved from the wing to fullback with Bautista Delguy joining the starting XV on the wing. Juan Cruz Mallía replaced Delguy on the bench.
 Florian Roșu (Romania) and Juan Martín González (Argentina) made their international debuts.
 Argentina retained the Latin Cup.

Notes:
 Will Hooley (United States) had been named to start but withdrew ahead of the game due to injury; Marcel Brache moved from centre to fullback to replace him and Calvin Whiting moved from the bench to centre. Christian Dyer replaced Whiting on the bench.
 Lewis Ludlow became the fifth player to captain England on debut and the first man since Nigel Melville in 1984.
 Jamie Blamire, Callum Chick, Ben Curry, Trevor Davison, Joe Heyes, Curtis Langdon, Lewis Ludlow, Josh McNally, Harry Randall, Marcus Smith, Freddie Steward and Jacob Umaga (all England) and Michael Baska, Luke Carty, Christian Dyer, Matt Harmon, Riekert Hattingh and Mika Kruse (all United States) made their international debuts.
 The United States made their highest score against England, surpassing the previous highest of 19 scored in 2001.

7 July

Notes:
 Florent Vanverberghe (France) had been named on the bench, but withdrew the day before the game due to injury and was replaced by Cyril Cazeaux.
 Andrew Kellaway Lachlan Lonergan and Darcy Swain (all Australia) and Gaëtan Barlot, Anthony Étrillard, Sipili Falatea, Teddy Iribaren, Melvyn Jaminet and Quentin Walcker (all France) made their international debuts.

9/10 July

Notes:
 Ethan de Groot (New Zealand) and Eneriko Buliruarua, Manasa Mataele and Peniami Narisia (all Fiji) made their international debuts.

Notes:
 This is the first draw between these two nations in 19 meetings.

Notes:
 Alex Dombrandt, Dan Kelly, Adam Radwan and Harry Wells (all England) and Lockie Kratz, Liam Murray and Corey Thomas (all Canada) made their international debuts.
 England's opening try was their quickest test try since Jonathan Webb scored in 23 seconds vs Ireland at Twickenham in 1992.
 Adam Radwan became the sixth English player to score a hat trick on test debut, the last was Jeremy Guscott against Romania in 1989.
 Jamie Blamire became the second English hooker to score a test hat trick after Jamie George became the first against Georgia during the Autumn Nations Cup.

Notes:
 Robert Baloucoune, Caolin Blade, Paul Boyle, Harry Byrne, James Hume, Tom O'Toole, Nick Timoney and Fineen Wycherley (all Ireland) and Andrew Guerra (United States) made their international debuts.
 Ronan Kelleher became the fourth Irish player to score four tries in a test match.
 Ireland registered their largest home win against the United States.

13 July

Notes:
 Len Ikitau (Australia) and Pierre-Henri Azagoh, Ibrahim Diallo, Enzo Forletta and Wilfrid Hounkpatin (all France) made their international debuts.
 France win in Australia for the first time since their 28–19 victory in Sydney in the final test of their 1990 tour.

17 July

Notes:
 Dane Coles (New Zealand) was named on the bench but was withdrawn due to injury and replaced by Samisoni Taukei'aho.
 Samisoni Taukei'aho (New Zealand) and Kitione Kamikamica, Moses Sorovi and Teti Tela (all Fiji) made their international debut.
 Ardie Savea and Anton Lienert-Brown (New Zealand) earned their 50th test cap.

Notes:
 Cyril Cazeaux (France) was named to start but withdrew ahead of the game and was replaced by Pierre-Henri Azagoh. Baptiste Pesenti replaced Azagoh on the bench.
 Alexandre Bécognée, Antoine Hastoy and Julien Hériteau (all France) made their international debuts.
 Australia retained the Trophée des Bicentenaires.
 Australia win a home test-series for the first time since France last toured to Australia in 2014.

{| border="0" style="width:100%;" class="collapsible collapsed"
|-
!Team details
|-
|
{| style="width:100%"
|-
|style="vertical-align:top;width:50%"|
{| cellspacing="0" cellpadding="0"
|-
!width="25"| !!width="25"|
|-
|FB ||15||Aphelele Fassi
|-
|RW ||14||Yaw Penxe || || 
|-
|OC ||13||Wandisile Simelane ||  || 
|-
|IC ||12||Damian de Allende || || 
|-
|LW ||11||Rosko Specman
|-
|FH ||10||Elton Jantjies (c)
|-
|SH ||9 ||Cobus Reinach || || 
|-
|N8 ||8 ||Kwagga Smith
|-
|BF ||7 ||Rynhardt Elstadt
|-
|OF ||6 ||Marco van Staden || || 
|-
|RL ||5 ||Nico Janse van Rensburg
|-
|LL ||4 ||Jean-Luc du Preez
|-
|TP ||3 ||Vincent Koch || || 
|-
|HK ||2 ||Joseph Dweba || || 
|-
|LP ||1 ||Coenie Oosthuizen || || 
|-
|colspan=3|'Replacements (from)':'|-
|HK ||16||Fez Mbatha || || 
|-
|PR ||17||Thomas du Toit || ||  || 
|-
|PR ||18||Wilco Louw || || 
|-
|LF ||19||Jasper Wiese || || 
|-
|SH ||20||Sanele Nohamba || || 
|-
|WG ||21||Sbu Nkosi || || 
|-
|CE ||22||Jesse Kriel || || 
|-
|FB ||23||Damian Willemse || || 
|-
|PR ||24||Lizo Gqoboka || || || 
|-
|colspan=3|Coach:|-
|colspan="4"| Jacques Nienaber
|}
|valign=top|
|style="vertical-align:top;width:50%"|

|}

|}Notes: Matthew Screech (Wales) made his international debut.
 Matías Moroni (Argentina) earned his 50th test cap.
 This was Argentina's first win over Wales since their 26–12 victory in 2012, the last time they won in Wales.
 Argentina win a test series for the first time since their 2-0 series win against Ireland in 2007.
 Argentina record their biggest winning margin over Wales (22-point difference), surpassing the 18-point difference set in 2006.
 This is the most points Argentina have scored against Wales when away from Argentina.

24 JulyNotes: Wyn Jones (British & Irish Lions) was named to start but withdrew ahead of the game due to injury and was replaced by Rory Sutherland - Mako Vunipola came onto the bench.
 Tadhg Beirne, Dan Biggar, Tom Curry, Jack Conan, Luke Cowan-Dickie, Robbie Henshaw, Stuart Hogg, Ali Price, Rory Sutherland, Duhan van der Merwe and Hamish Watson all made their Lions test debuts.
 Handré Pollard (South Africa) earned his 50th test cap.

31 JulyNotes: Steven Kitshoff (South Africa) earned his 50th test cap.
 Chris Harris (British & Irish Lions) made his Lions test debut.

7 AugustNotes: Scott Barrett and Dane Coles (New Zealand) were named as replacements but were injured in the warm-up and were replaced by Patrick Tuipulotu and Samisoni Taukei'aho respectively.
 Aaron Smith became the tenth All Black player to earn his 100th test cap.Notes:'''
 Damian de Allende (South Africa) earned his 50th test cap.
 Josh Adams, Bundee Aki, Adam Beard, Wyn Jones, Finn Russell and Sam Simmonds all made their Lions test debuts.

Notes

See also
 2021 end-of-year rugby union internationals
 2023 Rugby World Cup qualifying
 2021 Rugby Championship

References

2021
2021 in North American rugby union
July rugby union tests
2020–21 in English rugby union